Culter flavipinnis is a species of cyprinid fish that is endemic to Vietnam.

References 

Culter (fish)
Endemic fauna of Vietnam
Fish described in 1883
Taxa named by Gilbert Tirant